Smithfield was an electoral district of the Legislative Assembly in the Australian state of New South Wales from 1988 to 2015. It was abolished in 2015 and largely replaced by Prospect.

Members for Smithfield

Election results

References

External links

Smithfield
1988 establishments in Australia
Smithfield
2015 disestablishments in Australia
Smithfield